Peter Gonnella (born 14 January 1963) is an Australian cricketer. He played nineteen first-class matches for Western Australia between 1984/85 and 1988/89.

See also
 List of Western Australia first-class cricketers

References

External links
 

1963 births
Living people
Australian cricketers
Western Australia cricketers